Nassarius niveus, common name the lattice dogwhelk, is a species of sea snail, a marine gastropod mollusk in the family Nassariidae, the Nassa mud snails or dog whelks.

Description
The shell size varies between 15 mm and 25 mm

Distribution
This species occurs in the Atlantic Ocean off Angola, Namibia and the west coast of South Africa

References

 Adam W. & Knudsen J. 1984. Révision des Nassariidae (Mollusca : Gastropoda Prosobranchia) de l’Afrique occidentale. Bulletin de l'Institut Royal des Sciences Naturelles de Belgique 55(9): 1-95, 5 pl.
 Bernard, P.A. (Ed.) (1984). Coquillages du Gabon [Shells of Gabon]. Pierre A. Bernard: Libreville, Gabon. 140, 75 plates pp.
 Branch, G.M. et al. (2002). Two Oceans. 5th impression. David Philip, Cate Town & Johannesburg
 Cernohorsky W. O. (1984). Systematics of the family Nassariidae (Mollusca: Gastropoda). Bulletin of the Auckland Institute and Museum 14: 1–356.

External links
 Gastropods.com : Nassarius (Zeuxis) plicatellus; accessed : 31 December 2010

Nassariidae
Gastropods described in 1852